Nova Taipa Gardens is a property development project in Taipa, Macau, and completed from 1995 to 1996.

History 
The development is owned by two Hong Kong-based companies, Hopewell Holdings Ltd and Shun Tak Holdings Ltd.

Nova Taipa Gardens consists of 11 residential tower blocks bounded by Rua de Bragança, Avenida de Kwong Tong, Rua de Sang Tou and Avenida de Guimarães. The overall development project is scheduled to be completed in 5 phases.

Phase 1 of the Nova Taipa Gardens was completed in July 1997 with a total development area of over 3 million square feet supplying 2,228 units in 13 blocks and around 2,100 car park spaces.

The development also consisted of Nova City, a nine-tower development bounded by Rua de Coimbra, Avenida de Kwong Tong, Rua de Nam Keng and Avenida de Guimarães.

See also
 List of tallest buildings in Macau

References

Buildings and structures in Macau
Landmarks in Macau
1996 establishments in Macau